The Walter Abbs House, is a Queen Anne style house designed by Tourtellotte & Co. and constructed in Boise, Idaho, USA, in 1903. The five room house is part of the Fort Street Historic District, and it was included as a contributing property on November 12, 1982. It was individually listed on the National Register of Historic Places on November 17, 1982.

Walter J. Abbs arrived in Boise in 1901 and formed the firm of McGrew & Abbs, abstract researchers, mortgage lenders, and insurance agents. When his business was absorbed by the Boise Title and Trust Co. in 1906, Abbs became general manager and secretary of the new firm. Abbs was an investor in Boise's Abbs Subdivision, and lots on Abbs Street and on Abbs Lane were sold as early as 1917.

References

External links

National Register of Historic Places in Ada County, Idaho
Houses on the National Register of Historic Places in Idaho
Queen Anne architecture in Idaho
Houses completed in 1903
Individually listed contributing properties to historic districts on the National Register in Idaho